Brackenlands is an area of Wigton in Cumbria, England.

Villages in Cumbria
Wigton